
Christ the Saviour Monastery, also known as Christminster, is a Benedictine monastery of the Russian Orthodox Church Outside Russia (ROCOR) in Hamilton, Canada. The monastery is an institution of Western Rite Orthodoxy.

History 
Founded in 1993 in Rhode Island in the United States, Christminster moved to Hamilton, Ontario, in 2008, incorporating the Oratory of Our Lady of Glastonbury as its monastery chapel. The oratory had previously been a mission of the Antiochian Western Rite Vicariate in the Antiochian Orthodox Christian Archdiocese of North America but since October 2007 has been within ROCOR.

The monastery celebrates a daily round of services in the oratory, including Sung Mass on Sunday mornings and Vespers and Benediction on Sunday evenings. The Mass is the Divine Liturgy of St Gregory, which is based on the Pre-Tridentine Mass.

References

External links
 Christ the Saviour Monastery
 Oratory of Our Lady of Glastonbury

Eastern Orthodox monasteries in Canada
Monasteries of the Russian Orthodox Church Outside of Russia
Russian Orthodoxy in the United States
Russian-Canadian culture